Football Club Pune City Women was an Indian women's football club based in Pune, Maharashtra, which last played in Indian Women's League, the top flight of Indian women's football. The club was established 2017, prior to the league's inaugural season.

History
In April 2016 it was announced by the All India Football Federation (AIFF) president, Praful Patel, that an Indian women's football league would begin in October 2016. Then, in July 2016, the AIFF hosted a workshop program for the proposed women's league at which Pune City, an Indian Super League side, were present. Finally, in October 2016, it was revealed that the Indian Women's League would kick off with a preliminary round on 17 October in which the top two teams during that round would qualify for a place in the league. Pune City were not part of this round.

A few months later, on 12 January 2017, the team announced that they would be fielding a side in the league proper, which would begin on 23 January.

Ownership
The women's team, like the men's side, was owned by a consortium which consists of the Wadhawan Group and Bollywood actor Arjun Kapoor.

Statistics and records

Season-by-season

Honours 
WIFA Women's Football League
Champions (1): 2017

See also

 Indian Women's League
 FC Pune City
FC Pune City Youth

References

External links

 

Womens
Football clubs in Pune
Defunct women's football clubs in India
Association football clubs established in 2017
Association football clubs disestablished in 2018
Indian Women's League clubs
2017 establishments in Maharashtra
2018 disestablishments in India